Matthew Belloni is an American journalist and podcaster. He is a founding partner of digital media company Puck. Before this, he was the editorial director of The Hollywood Reporter.

Education
Belloni graduated from the University of California, Berkeley with a bachelor's degree in political science and obtained a law degree from the University of Southern California School of Law, where he was a member of the USC Law Review.

Career
Belloni was an attorney at an entertainment law firm in Los Angeles, representing actors, filmmakers and media companies in disputes and litigation. He has also served as a contributor to magazines including Esquire and Town & Country.

Belloni joined The Hollywood Reporter in 2006, and was editorial director for the magazine from 2016 to 2020, where he was responsible for all editorial content. 

In April 2020, Belloni left The Hollywood Reporter after a dispute with management.

Belloni joined Puck in May 2021 as a founding partner and writes a twice-weekly newsletter called What I'm Hearing about the entertainment industry.

As an industry expert, Belloni appears regularly on shows such as NBC Nightly News, CBS This Morning, CNN, CNBC, and NPR's The Business.

In March 2022, Belloni launched Hollywood insider podcast The Town on The Ringer Podcast Network.

Awards
In 2020, Belloni and The Hollywood Reporter won the National Magazine Award for general excellence, special interest publication, from the American Society of Magazine Editors.

References

Living people
American journalists
American podcasters